The 2019 Città di Como Challenger was a professional tennis tournament played on clay courts. It was the fourteenth edition of the tournament which was part of the 2019 ATP Challenger Tour. It took place in Como, Italy between 26 August and 1 September 2019.

Singles main-draw entrants

Seeds

 1 Rankings are as of 19 August 2019.

Other entrants
The following players received wildcards into the singles main draw:
  Francesco Forti
  Federico Iannaccone
  Lorenzo Musetti
  Julian Ocleppo
  Giulio Zeppieri

The following player received entry into the singles main draw using a protected ranking:
  Daniel Altmaier

The following players received entry into the singles main draw as alternates:
  Riccardo Bonadio
  Andrea Collarini

The following players received entry from the qualifying draw:
  Gonzalo Escobar
  Khumoyun Sultanov

The following player received entry as a lucky loser:
  Fabien Reboul

Champions

Singles

  Facundo Mena def.  Andrej Martin 2–6, 6–4, 6–1.

Doubles

  Andre Begemann /  Florin Mergea def.  Fabrício Neis /  Pedro Sousa 5–7, 7–5, [14–12].

References

Città di Como Challenger
2019
2019 in Italian sport
August 2019 sports events in Italy
September 2019 sports events in Italy